Events in the year 1867 in Norway.

Incumbents
Monarch: Charles IV

Events

Arts and literature

Births

January to June
 

19 January – Isak Kobro Collett, politician (died 1911)
20 January – Mons Monssen, sailor in the United States Navy who received the Medal of Honor (died 1930)
29 January – Carl L. Boeckmann, artist (died 1923)
5 March – Ingebrigt Vik, sculptor (died 1927)
15 May – Hjalmar Johansen, polar explorer (died 1913)

July to December
 

2 July – Hjalmar Krag, businessman and sports official (died 1954).
24 July – Olav Kringen, newspaper editor (died 1951).
27 July – Mikal Angell Jacobus Landmark, politician (died 1939)
2 August – Johanne Dybwad, actress (died 1950).
15 August – Anathon Aall, academic (died 1943)
8 October – Christian Hansen Wollnick, newspaper editor, jurist and politician (died 1936)
4 November – Martin Julius Halvorsen, newspaper editor and politician
10 December – Lauritz Christiansen, sailor and Olympic gold medallist (died 1930)
13 December – Kristian Birkeland, scientist (died 1917)
27 December – Fredrik Stang, politician and Minister (died 1941)

Full date unknown
Hauk Aabel, comedian and actor (died 1961)
Barthold Hansteen Cranner, botanist (died 1925)
Johan Fahlstrøm, actor and theatre manager (died 1938)
Alfred Klingenberg, pianist (died 1944)
Wilhelm Christian Magelssen, politician and Minister (died 1930)
Kristian Friis Petersen, politician and Minister (died 1932)

Deaths
24 June - Paul Andreas Kaald, navy officer and businessman (born 1784)
14 August – Bersvend Martinussen Røkkum, politician (born 1806)
12 September – Hans Eleonardus Møller, politician and businessperson (born 1804)
24 November – Peter Bøyesen, businessperson and politician (born 1799)

Full date unknown
Jørgen Flood, merchant and politician (born 1792)
Hans Kiær, politician (born 1795)
Hans Andersen Kiær, businessperson and politician (born 1795)

See also

References